Railways:
0 km

Highways:
total:
269 km
paved:
203 km
unpaved:
66 km (1995)

Waterways:
none

Ports and harbours:
Plymouth (abandoned), Little Bay (anchorages and ferry landing), Carr's Bay

Merchant marine:
none (2002 est.)

Airports:
One, Gerald's Airport, opened on 11 July 2005 replacing W.H. Bramble Airport which was destroyed by volcanic eruption in 1997.

See also : Montserrat

Sources
CIA World Factbook

 
Transport in British Overseas Territories